Eugene M Verebes is a male former fencer who competed for England.

Fencing career
He represented England and won a gold medal in the team sabre at the 1958 British Empire and Commonwealth Games in Cardiff, Wales.

Personal life
He was a Hungarian company director and became a British citizen in August 1956 shortly before the Hungarian Revolution of 1956. He married Helene Reimann in 1971.

References

English male fencers
Commonwealth Games medallists in fencing
Commonwealth Games gold medallists for England
Fencers at the 1958 British Empire and Commonwealth Games
Medallists at the 1958 British Empire and Commonwealth Games